"The Drumhead" is the 95th episode of the syndicated American science fiction television series Star Trek: The Next Generation and the 21st episode of the program's fourth season. The episode was directed by cast member Jonathan Frakes. It takes the form of a courtroom drama.

Set in the 24th century, the series follows the adventures of the Starfleet crew of the Federation starship Enterprise-D. In this episode, an explosion aboard the Enterprise leads to a high-level investigation headed by Admiral Norah Satie (played by Jean Simmons), a retired officer renowned for her skill at exposing conspiracies.

Plot

When an explosion within the dilithium chamber of the Federation starship Enterprises main engineering appears to be the work of sabotage, Starfleet Command dispatches a retired rear admiral from the Legal Division of its Support Services Section, Norah Satie (Jean Simmons), to lead an investigation to uncover the cause.

Worf (Michael Dorn) discovers that J'Dan (Henry Woronicz), a Klingon exchange officer, had been using modified hypospray syringes to encode information into amino acid sequences for secret transport. J'Dan admits his collaboration with the Romulans but attests that he did not sabotage the chamber. Satie and Captain Jean-Luc Picard (Patrick Stewart) interview crew members who associated with J'Dan, including Dr. (Cmdr.) Beverly Crusher and medical technician Simon Tarses (Spencer Garrett). Meanwhile, Chief Engineer (Lt. Cmdr.) Geordi La Forge (LeVar Burton) and Lieutenant Commander Data (Brent Spiner) determine that the hatch had failed due to simple fatigue, not sabotage.

Picard considers the matter closed, but Satie expands her search for traitors, revealing Tarses' Romulan heritage and questioning Picard's guilt following his time as Locutus of Borg. Satie's political ally Admiral Thomas Henry (Earl Billings) attends the tribunals. Picard begins to compare the tribunal to a drumhead, resembling a battle-field court-martial of the 18th and 19th centuries infamous for its numerous miscarriages of justice.

Picard recalls a quote from Satie's own father Aaron Satie: "With the first link, the chain is forged. The first speech censured, the first thought forbidden, the first freedom denied, chains us all irrevocably." Satie is enraged at him invoking her father and condemns Picard as a traitor. Admiral Henry becomes disgusted with Satie's fanaticism and calls a halt to any additional investigation. Picard notes that such fanatics are well-disguised through apparent good words and deeds, and humanity must remain vigilant against them to protect their freedom.

References to other episodes
 Satie comments on Worf's father being a Romulan collaborator, referring to events in the third season episode "Sins of the Father".
 Satie questions Picard's actions regarding the Romulan spy T'Pel, referring to events in the fourth season episode "Data's Day".
 Satie refers to Picard's abduction by the Borg, as shown in "The Best of Both Worlds".

Reception
Zack Handlen of The A.V. Club gave the episode a grade A. Keith DeCandido of Tor.com rated it 3 out of 10.

"The Drumhead" was rated the 15th best episode of Star Trek: The Next Generation in 2016 by The Hollywood Reporter. Actor Michael Dorn, who played the character Worf on the show, has stated this was his favorite episode of the series, and in particular liked Worf and Picard's scene at the end of the episode.

In 2014, "The Drumhead" was rated as the 34th best episode of Star Trek by io9, when reviewing the top 100 episodes of all series up to that time (including animated and live-action television series). In 2018, Tom's Guide rated "The Drumhead" one of the 15 best episodes featuring Picard. In 2017, Den of Geek ranked Jean Simmons' role as one of the top ten guest stars on Star Trek: The Next Generation.

In 2017, Vulture.com listed this episode as one of the best of Star Trek: The Next Generation.

In 2018, Entertainment Weekly ranked "The Drumhead" as one of the top ten moments of Jean-Luc Picard. In 2018, Popular Mechanics highlighted "The Drumhead" as one of the best Picard episodes, and as recommended viewing for audiences to prepare for a new television series based on that character, Star Trek: Picard.

In 2019, The Hollywood Reporter ranked it among the top 25 episodes of Star Trek: The Next Generation, noting the acting performance by guest star Jean Simmons and its narrative warning about those who spread fear, of fanatical biases, and McCarthyism.

In 2020,  Games Radar recommended watching this episode prior to viewing Star Trek: Picard.

In 2020, Space.com listed this as of the ten greatest moments with the character Captain Picard, when he says, "With the first link, the chain is forged. The first speech censored. The first thought forbidden. The first freedom denied — chains us all irrevocably." during a trial for a spy aboard the spaceship.

In 2020,  ScreenRant ranked "The Drumhead" the number one best episode of all Star Trek franchise television episodes up to that time. That same year the rated as the most important TNG episode with a morality message that "in an age of social media and out of control fake news, Admiral Satie's rhetoric has been taken to insane extremes within our culture, forcing us to once again examine our propensity for falling victim to conspiracy theories and nefarious agendas perpetuated by bad-faith actors."

Home media releases 
This episode is featured on the Star Trek: The Next Generation - Jean-Luc Picard Collection DVD set for Region 1 only, released in 2004. 

CBS announced on September 28, 2011, in celebration of the series' twenty-fifth anniversary, that Star Trek: The Next Generation would be completely re-mastered in 1080p high definition from the original 35mm film negatives. For the remaster almost 25,000 reels of original film stock were rescanned and reedited, and all visual effects were digitally recomposed from original large-format negatives and newly created CGI shots. The release was accompanied by 7.1 DTS Master Audio. On July 30, 2013 "The Drumhead" was released on 1080p high definition as part of the Season 4 Blu-ray box set in the United States. The set was released on July 29, 2013, in the United Kingdom.

This episode was released in the United States on September 3, 2002, as part of the Star Trek: The Next Generation season four DVD box set.

See also

 "Balance of Terror" (Star Trek, aired December 15, 1966, S1E14, first episode with Romulans)

References

Notes
 Guest star Jean Simmons, a noted longtime Trekkie, portrays retired Rear Admiral Norah Satie, a special investigator who visits the Federation starship Enterprise.
 Michael Dorn said this was one of his two favorite episodes, the other being "The Offspring", which Jonathan Frakes also directed.
 "The Drumhead" was the last Star Trek episode to have its music scored by  Ron Jones, whom producers Rick Berman and Peter Lauritson dismissed, shortly after he had completed his work on it, as "Ron's stuff was getting big and somewhat flamboyant" and the producers "decided to move on and try other composers."

Citations

 Star Trek The Next Generation DVD set, volume 4, disc 6, selection 1.

External links

 

 "The Drumhead" rewatch by Keith R. A. DeCandido

Star Trek: The Next Generation (season 4) episodes
1991 American television episodes
Television courtroom dramas
Military courtroom dramas
Television episodes directed by Jonathan Frakes